"Crying Lightning" is a song by the English indie rock band Arctic Monkeys, released as the first single from their third album Humbug. It was first played on Zane Lowe's show on BBC Radio 1 on 6 July 2009 and was then made available on iTunes to download the sameday. Physical copies of the single were made available on 17 August, one week before the release of the album. The vinyl was made available in Oxfam shops and sold with a download code for fans to get a free MP3 version of the song.

The single debuted at number 12 on the UK Singles Chart on 12 July 2009 by downloads alone.

Music video
The music video for the single debuted on Channel 4 in UK on 24 July 2009.

The music video, directed by Richard Ayoade (who worked with the band previously on the video for "Fluorescent Adolescent", as well as their At the Apollo live DVD), shows the band performing the song on a boat on a rough sea. During a short instrumental interlude, a large figure rises up from the sea in the form of frontman, Turner. He falls to his knees where the boat passes between his legs before the other three band members (Cook, Helders and O'Malley) also rise up out from the water.

Track listing

Credits and personnel
Arctic Monkeys
Alex Turner – lead vocals, lead and rhythm guitar, Vox Super Continental Organ 
Jamie Cook – lead and rhythm guitar, baritone guitar 
Nick O'Malley – bass guitar, backing vocals
Matt Helders – drums, backing vocals

Additional musicians
Josh Homme – backing vocals 
John Ashton – keyboards, backing vocals

Charts

Certifications

References

2009 singles
Arctic Monkeys songs
Charity singles
Songs written by Alex Turner (musician)
2009 songs